Someday, Maybe is a 2022 fiction novel by British-Nigerian writer Onyi Nwabineli. It was published on 1 November 2022 in the United Kingdom by Magpie Books, an imprint of Oneworld publications, and by Graydon House in the United States. It follows follows Eve Ezenwa-Morrow, a Nigerian woman in an interracial marriage trying to cope with grief, depression and suicide after her husband's death.

Reception 
The novel received critically positive reception. It was selected as one of the five books for the Good Morning America picks, with Nwabineli later appearing on the show. A review from Kirkus Reviews stated that "Nwabineli's debut is deeply moving, tender, and, against all odds, funny." Publishers Weekly in a starred review praised Nwabineli writing highlighting that "The genuine displays of emotion and sharp narrative will keep readers turning the pages.”

References 

2022 Nigerian novels
2022 debut novels
2022 British novels
Novels set in the United Kingdom
Contemporary romance novels